Lisa Knapp (born 1974 in Balham), is an English folk singer, songwriter, fiddle player and multi-instrumentalist. Her singing voice has been described as "crystal clear" and reminiscent of Anne Briggs or Jeannie Robertson. Two of her three albums have received five-starred reviews in the British national press.

Early life
Lisa Knapp was born in 1974 in Balham in south London and raised in Tooting, also in south London.

Albums
Her debut album, Wild and Undaunted, released in 2007, was Mojo 's  Folk Album of the Year. It includes a cover version of Lal Waterson's song "Black Horse".

Colin Irwin gave her 2013 album Hidden Seam, which included contributions by Martin Carthy and Kathryn Williams, five stars in a review for The Observer. The lyrics of the album's opening track, "Shipping Song", derive from BBC Radio 4's Shipping Forecast. Another song from the album, "Two Ravens", took the award for Best Original Song at the BBC Radio 2 Folk Awards in 2014.

Till April is Dead – A Garland Of May, Knapp's 2017 concept album about the month of May, "twists tradition... mixing in interviews about May Day rituals and samples of birdsong, buzzing flies and cuckoo clocks". It received a five-starred review in The Guardian from Jude Rogers who described it as "overflowing with warmth, light and waywardness". "Knapp’s voice throughout", she said, "is a revelation, both pure and wild, springing free". Writing in The Observer, Neil Spencer gave four stars to Till April is Dead – A Garland for May, which he described as completing "a trio of extraordinary albums". Thomas Blake, for Folk Radio UK, said that the album "seeks to understand old songs and traditions in modern and often highly original ways. It is a real step forward from a genuinely groundbreaking artist".

Personal life
Knapp is married to musician Gerry Diver, who co-produces her albums. They have a daughter, Bonnie.

Discography

Albums
 Wild and Undaunted (2007), Ear to the Ground Music ETTGCD 001
Hidden Seam (2013), Navigator Records NAVIGATOR 084
Till April is Dead – A Garland Of May (2017), Ear to the Ground Music ETTGM 003CD

EPs
 Hunt the Hare – A Branch Of May (2012), Ear to the Ground Music

Other musical contributions
Knapp sang  "The Blacksmith" and "Bonnie at Morn" on Gerry Diver's album, Diversions (2002) and also performed on two of the tracks on David Rotheray's 2013 album Answer Ballads. She also sang "A Promise That I Keep" for the theme song for Wolfblood series 1–3.

References

External links
Official website

1974 births
Living people
21st-century English musicians
English women singer-songwriters
English folk musicians
English multi-instrumentalists
People from Balham
21st-century English women musicians
21st-century English women singers
21st-century English singers